Kim Jong-min (born September 24, 1979) is a South Korean singer, dancer and television personality. He has been a member of the K-pop group Koyote since 2000 and a cast member of the variety show 2 Days & 1 Night since 2007.

Kim has won numerous prizes including the Grand Prize (Daesang) at the 2016 KBS Entertainment Awards for his work on 2 Days & 1 Night.

Career

Pre-debut
Before debuting as a member of Koyote, Kim worked as a backup dancer for Uhm Jung-hwa, Lee Jung Hyun, Kim Wan-sun, R.E.F and many other artists. He was on the dance team "Friends" for five years.

Variety appearances
Kim is known for being a mainstay of many Korean variety shows (such as KBS' Heroine 6 and Choi Hong Man Strong Friends and formerly SBS' Real Romance Love Letter), as he has become a goofy, naïve on-screen character known for silly comments and actions. He was also an assistant soccer coach on KBS' FC Shoot Dori and has also made appearances on MBC's King Saturday Driving School and Happy Shares Company, SBS' Love Choice (Selection Couple), X-Man, and Ya Shim Man Man, and KBS' Star Golden Bell and Happy Together Friends.

In 2007, Kim became a cast member of KBS' Happy Sunday lineup as part of 1 Night 2 Days and has been with the program to date, being the only pioneer member who witnessed 1 Night 2 Days from Season 1 till Season 4. From November 2007 until December 2009, he served his mandatory military service as a public service worker. He was initially due to enlist in March but received a six-month postponement as his medical examination revealed a herniated disc, leading to him being assigned as a public service worker rather than in an army unit.

Post-military, he was invited to many programs as a guest and also became a regular guest and permanent member on SBS' Star King and KBS2's Sweet Night.

On December 30, 2013, he won the Best Entertainer Award at the 2013 SBS Entertainment Awards for Star King.

On December 26, 2015, he won the Top Excellence Award at the 2015 KBS Entertainment Awards for 1 Night 2 Days.

On December 24, 2016, he was awarded with the Grand Prize Award (Daesang) for his commitment and loyalty with KBS 1 Night 2 Days at the 2016 KBS Entertainment Awards.

In September 2017, it was confirmed that Kim would be a fixed cast member in Netflix's variety show Busted!.

Solo career
In the first quarter of 2011, he released his very first single entitled "Oppa Find Strength". His promotional clip from the MV depicted the negative comments that he received after his return from military service.

He made his solo comeback on September 3, 2014 as he released his third single, "Sali Go Dali Go", an electronic dance music composed by DanDi. The music video of featured Chun Myung-hoon (NRG) and comedian Ahn Young-mi. His new track peaked at ranking number eight on China's popular music video sharing site, Yinyuetai.

Discography

Singles

Soundtrack appearances

Filmography

Film

Music Videos 

Kang Ho-dong & Jeong Chae-eun — Look Out of the Window
VASIA — Love Story
 — 따따블 
 Charlie & Shinba — Good Zombie (feat. Zingo)

Television series

Variety Shows

Present Shows

Former Shows

Web shows

Other Activities

PR Ambassador 

 2016 – PR Ambassador of Dobong-gu for two year.

Awards and nominations

Notes

References

External links
  Koyote Official Site
  Kim Jong-min's Cyworld

1979 births
Living people
21st-century South Korean male singers
K-pop singers
South Korean dance music singers
South Korean male dancers
South Korean male television actors
South Korean television personalities